The  (German for Aviation Security Act) is a German law created in response to the September 11 attacks which came into force on 2005-01-15. § 14 (3) would have granted the Bundeswehr permission to use weapons against commercial airliners once their designation as a weapon by hijackers had become apparent. However, the clause was declared unconstitutional by the Federal Constitutional Court on 15 February 2006. The court affirmed that the sacrifice of innocent lives to the benefit of another group violated the unconditionally protected human dignity under Article 1 of the German constitution.

See also
:de:Urteil des Bundesverfassungsgerichts zum Luftsicherheitsgesetz 2005
Trolley problem

References

External links
Full text of the law
Press release of the Federal Constitutional Court of Germany
Guidelines
Guideline risk assessment
Guideline threat management
Transitional settlement 2005/2017/2019

Law of Germany
Aircraft hijacking